"Terence" Tse Kin Leung (中文：謝健良)is a Hong Kong racing driver currently competing in the TCR International Series and TCR Asia Series. Having previously competed in the Asian Formula Renault Series and Clio Cup China Series amongst others.

Racing career
Tse began his career in 2015 in the Clio Cup China Series, he also raced in the Asian Formula Renault Series at the same time. He finished 7th in both series'. He continued in the Clio Cup China Series for 2016, finishing 4th in the standings. He switched to the TCR Asia Series for 2016, joining the series with Roadstar Racing.

In November 2016 it was announced that he would race in the TCR International Series, driving a SEAT León Cup Racer for Roadstar Racing. However he failed to qualify for the races.

Business career
Terence Tse is the owner/operator of Chit Fai Motors Group Limited, which provides minibus services connecting Whampoa, Hung Hom, Hong Kong. After the opening of the MTR Kwun Tong Line extension, his four minibus routes suffered HK$2 million loss, in the end he had to cease providing these services.

Racing record

Complete TCR International Series results
(key) (Races in bold indicate pole position) (Races in italics indicate fastest lap)

† Driver did not finish the race, but was classified as he completed over 90% of the race distance.

References

External links
 

Living people
TCR International Series drivers
TCR Asia Series drivers
Hong Kong racing drivers
Year of birth missing (living people)